Joseph Pombo (born in Mendi, Papua New Guinea) is a professional rugby league footballer who currently plays for the Halswell Hornets in the Canterbury Rugby League. He is a Papua New Guinea international.

Playing career
Pombo first started playing rugby league in his native Papua New Guinea before moving to New Zealand in 2004. Pombo plays for the Halswell Hornets club in the Canterbury Rugby League and was a Canterbury Bulls representative between 2006 and 2009.

In 2010 he was picked for a Canterbury A side to trial against the South Island team but declined.

Representative career
Pombo first represented Papua New Guinea in 2001. He did not play again for the national side until he was picked in the squad for the 2010 Four Nations.

References

1983 births
Living people
Papua New Guinean rugby league players
Papua New Guinea national rugby league team players
Canterbury rugby league team players
Halswell Hornets players
Papua New Guinean emigrants to New Zealand
Rugby league props